Jet Attack (also known as Jet Alert and released in the UK as Through Hell to Glory) is a 1958 American aviation war film set in the Korean War, featuring United States Air Force (USAF) aircraft.

Plot
During the Korean War, scientist Dean Olmstead (Joseph Hamilton) designs a long-range radio transmitting and tracking device for the United States Air Force. During testing of the device, Capt. Tom Arnett (John Agar), leading an escort of North American F-86 Sabre jet fighters, is unable to prevent Olmstead's North American B-25 Mitchell bomber being shot down in North Korea. His commanding officer, Col. Catlett (George Cisar) plans a rescue of the scientist, whom he believes is still alive and may be undergoing interrogation by Soviet intelligence agents working with the North Koreans.

Arnett and Lt. Bill Clairborn (Gregory Walcott) are assigned to go into North Korea and bring back Olmstead. After parachuting behind enemy lines, they meet up with guerrilla leader Capt. Chon (Victor Sen Yung), who takes them to Tanya Nikova (Audrey Totter), a Russian nurse, who has been working as a spy for the guerrillas. Tanya had previously been romantically involved with Arnett, but proves invaluable to the mission. She knows that the scientist may be under care of her boss, Col. Kuban (Robert Carricart), a Russian doctor. After they discover Olmstead's whereabouts and bring him out of the prison camp where he was being treated for a concussion, the group is pursued by North Korean Maj. Wan (Leonard Strong). Tanya is wounded during the escape but manages to drive the Americans to an airfield. She dies, but the two American pilots and the scientist make good their escape in a pair of North Korean MiG-15 jet fighters.  However Clairborn deliberately crashes his plane into a attacking Korean fighter being unable to discover how to fire the Mig's guns.

Cast

 John Agar as Capt. Tom Arnett
 Audrey Totter as Tanya Nikova
 Gregory Walcott as Lt. Bill Clairborn
 James Dobson as Lt. Sandy Wilkerson
 Leonard Strong as Maj. Wan
 Nicky Blair as Radioman Chick Lane
 Victor Sen Yung as Capt. Chon
 Joseph Hamilton  as Dean Olmstead
 Guy Prescott as Maj. Garver
 George Cisar as Col. Catlett
 Stella Lynn as Muju
 Robert Carricart as Col. Kuban

Production
Jet Attack relied heavily on "stock war footage and studio shots". The mismatched footage led to unintended continuity errors. California Air National Guard North American F-86A Sabres from the 196th Fighter Interceptor Squadron stood in for both USAF and North Korean fighters.

Release
American International Pictures released Jet Attack as a double feature with Suicide Battalion.

Reception
The film was included in the 1978 book, The Fifty Worst Films of All Time (and How They Got That Way), by Harry Medved, Randy Dreyfuss, and Michael Medved.
Like many other films of the period that were set in the Korean War, film historian Michael Paris considered it another of the "... features that had little to say that was new; most simply reprised situations common from earlier films and were a blatant attempt to profit from public interest in the war."

See also
 List of American films of 1958

References
Notes

Citations

Bibliography

 Paris, Michael. From the Wright Brothers to Top Gun: Aviation, Nationalism, and Popular Cinema. Manchester, UK: Manchester University Press, 1995. .
 Pendo, Stephen. Aviation in the Cinema. Lanham, Maryland: Scarecrow Press, 1985. .

External links
 
 
 

1958 films
1958 war films
American aviation films
American war films
American International Pictures films
American black-and-white films
Films directed by Edward L. Cahn
Korean War aviation films
Films scored by Ronald Stein
1950s English-language films
1950s American films